Lee Hye-in (born November 13, 1995) is a South Korean actress.

Filmography

Television series

Variety show

Awards and nominations

References

External links 
 
 

1995 births
Living people
21st-century South Korean actresses
South Korean child actresses
South Korean television actresses